Prostanthera makinsonii is a species of flowering plant in the family Lamiaceae and is endemic to a restricted area of New South Wales. It is a spreading shrub with strongly aromatic, egg-shaped leaves and mostly glabrous purple flowers arranged in bunches of eight to twelve in upper leaf axils.

Description
Flowering has been observed in November.

Taxonomy
Prostanthera makinsonii was first formally described in 2015 by Barry Conn and Trevor Wilson in the journal Telopea from specimens collected near Dinner Time Creek in Kosciuszko National Park. The specific epithet (makinsonii) honours Robert (Bob) Makinson for his contribution to the conservation of the flora of New South Wales.

Distribution and habitat
This mintbush grows in open Eucalyptus radiata forest, but is only known from the Goobarrangandra Valley on the Southern Tablelands of New South Wales.

References

makinsonii
Flora of New South Wales
Lamiales of Australia
Taxa named by Barry John Conn
Plants described in 2015